The Hume Highway exits and major intersections are spread across the Australian states of New South Wales and Victoria.

The Hume Highway national route is divided into four sections comprising, from north to south, urban stretches of the highway in Sydney, a motorway from the outskirts of Sydney to the Southern Highlands, a grade-separated highway in regional New South Wales, and a freeway throughout Victoria.

In New South Wales

Hume Highway in Sydney

Hume Motorway

Hume Highway in regional areas

In Victoria

Hume Freeway

See also

Highways in Australia
List of highways in New South Wales
List of highways in Victoria

References

 *